Caren Marsh Doll ( Morris; born April 6, 1919), also credited as Caren Marsh, is an American former stage and screen actress and dancer specializing in modern dance and tap. She is notable as Judy Garland's stand-in in The Wizard of Oz (1939) and Ziegfeld Girl (1941).  She is one of the last surviving actors from the Golden Age of Hollywood.

From 1937 until 1948, Marsh appeared in motion pictures with Metro-Goldwyn-Mayer, including a small uncredited part in Gone with the Wind. She became a dance instructor in 1956.

Her younger sister was film and television actress Dorothy Morris.

Early life 
Marsh was born in Hollywood, California on April 6, 1919. Her father was a Hollywood stockbroker. She and her family were active in the Methodist church. In 1937, she graduated from Hollywood High School and wanted to become an actress. Her parents did not approve of this choice and preferred she pursue a college education. They compromised by telling Caren that unless she could land an acting job she would be sent to school.

Film career 
Marsh auditioned for a role in Rosalie (1937), starring Nelson Eddy and Eleanor Powell, but did not win the role. She later re-auditioned for that movie and got the part. She was hired as Judy Garland's dance stand-in for The Wizard of Oz. She was hired largely mostly because she was similar in height and build to Garland and even received her own pair of ruby slippers. She served as a stand-in for Garland a second time with Ziegfeld Girl (1941). According to Marsh, when she wasn't filling in for Garland in The Wizard of Oz she would be across Hollywood at Selznick International Pictures working as an extra in Gone with the Wind (1939).

In film, credited under the name Caren Marsh, she appeared in films such as That Night in Rio (1941), Hands Across the Border (1944), Wild Harvest (1947), Girl Crazy (1943), Best Foot Forward (1943), Seven Sweethearts (1942), and Night and Day (1946). She did appear in speaking parts in films as Secrets of a Sorority Girl (1945) and Navajo Kid (1945).

In 1947, Marsh was named Miss Sky Lady of 1947 and began appearing in fewer films to focus on her new interest in dance. After appearing in an airshow as Miss Sky Lady, she took flight instruction classes, learned to fly and later dropped leaflets of her acting profile on various movie studios in Hollywood. She made an appearance on The Gabby Hayes Show in 1956, after which she became a dance instructor.

1949 plane crash survival 
On July 12, 1949, aged 30, Marsh was aboard Standard Air Lines Flight 897R, when the C-46E crashed. The flight had left Albuquerque, New Mexico, at 4:43 am. While on approach to the Lockheed Air Terminal in Burbank, California, at 7:40 am, the twin engine plane, flying too low, hooked a wingtip on a hill and crashed near Chatsworth, California, and Marsh was one of the 13 people who survived. Marsh was pulled from the wreckage by another passenger named Judy Frost. Marsh was hospitalized at Cedars of Lebanon Hospital for several weeks, and nearly had her left foot amputated. Marsh's doctors told her that she would likely never dance again, but after careful exercise she was able to heal and continue in her dancing.

The Wizard of Oz 
Although not a credited cast member, Marsh is one of a few known surviving personnel to have worked on the MGM film The Wizard of Oz. She has appeared in Wizard of Oz film festivals, conventions, and reunions.

Autobiography and 'Oz' festivals 
In November 2007, Marsh published her autobiography, Hollywood's Babe, in which she discussed her life in Hollywood, and her love affair with The Wizard of Oz.

In 2011, Marsh served as the Grand Marshal of the Oz-Stravaganza Parade in Chittenango, New York.

Personal life 
Marsh moved to Palm Springs, California, in 1957 and married Bill Doll (died 1979), a press agent to theatre and film producer Mike Todd. The Dolls had one son. Her sister, actress Dorothy Morris, became her neighbor when Marsh retired in 1971. The sisters lived next door to each other until Dorothy's death on November 20, 2011. She turned 100 in April 2019.

Once a month on the first Monday, Marsh volunteers as a dance therapy instructor at the Palm Springs Stroke Activity Center where the styles taught range from themes like ballroom dancing, country, Hawaiian, and belly dancing.  She is an active member of The Palm Springs United Methodist Community Church.

Filmography 
 The Gabby Hayes Show (television serial) appearing in episode: "Navajo Kid" (1956)
 Adventures of Don Juan (1948)
 Luxury Liner (1948)
 Wild Harvest (1947)
 Welcome Stranger (1947)
 Smash-Up: The Story of a Woman (1947)
 Night and Day (1946)
 Navajo Kid (1945)
 Secrets of a Sorority Girl (1945)
 Hands Across the Border (1944)
 Best Foot Forward (1943)
 Seven Sweethearts (1942)
 Ziegfeld Girl (1941)
 The Wizard of Oz (1939)
 Gone with the Wind (1939)
 Rosalie (1937)

References

External links 

Caren Marsh Interview at Western Clippings

1919 births
Living people
20th-century American actresses
21st-century American women
American film actresses
American television actresses
Actresses from Palm Springs, California
American female dancers
Dancers from California
Writers from Los Angeles
American United Methodists
Actresses from Hollywood, Los Angeles
American tap dancers
American memoirists
Hollywood High School alumni
People from Greater Los Angeles
Modern dancers
Survivors of aviation accidents or incidents
American women memoirists
American centenarians
Women centenarians